Gorenja Vas pri Leskovcu is a village southwest of Leskovec in the Municipality of Krško in eastern Slovenia. The area is part of the traditional region of Lower Carniola. It is now included with the rest of the municipality in the Lower Sava Statistical Region.

Name
Gorenja Vas pri Leskovcu was attested in historical sources as Oberndorf in 1445.

Cultural heritage
A number of Roman graves have been found in the area, indicating the western extent of the nearby Neviodunum necropolis.

References

External links
Gorenja Vas pri Leskovcu on Geopedia

Populated places in the Municipality of Krško